Lanai Airport , also written as Lānai Airport, is a state-owned public-use airport located three nautical miles or about 3.4 miles (6 km) southwest of the central business district of Lanai City (Lānai City), in Maui County, Hawaii. The airport began regular operations in 1930. It is the only airport serving the island of Lanai (Lānai).

It is included in the Federal Aviation Administration (FAA) National Plan of Integrated Airport Systems for 2021–2025, in which it is categorized as a non-hub primary commercial service facility.

Facilities and aircraft
The airport covers an area of 505 acres (204 ha) at an elevation of 1,308 feet (399 m) above mean sea level. It has one runway designated 3/21 with an asphalt surface measuring 5,001 by 150 feet (1,524 x 46 m).

For the 12-month period ending July 31, 2016, the airport had 6,326 aircraft operations, an average of 17 per day: 65% air taxi, 25% scheduled commercial, 9% general aviation and 1% military. In April 2022, there were no aircraft based at this airport.

The only commercial airline, Mokulele Airlines, operates Cessna Grand Caravan 208EX aircraft into Lanai.

Airlines and destinations

Statistics

Top destinations

Accidents and incidents

References

External links
 Lanai Airport
 Hawaii State Department of Transportation
 Topographic map from USGS The National Map
 
 

Airports in Hawaii
Buildings and structures in Maui County, Hawaii
Transportation in Maui County, Hawaii
Lanai
Airports established in 1930
1930 establishments in Hawaii